Gnaeus Cornelius Lentulus was a consul of the Roman Republic in 146 BC. His colleague was Lucius Mummius Achaicus, whose military achievements outshone him.

He was from the Lentuli branch of the gens Cornelia. He had held the office of praetor by 149 BC.

In 161, Cornelius Lentulus was sent as an ambassador with Publius Apustius to Cyrene for the purpose of informing Ptolemy VII of Rome's decision to end its alliance with Ptolemy VI.

Children 
His son, who had the same name, was consul in 97 BC.

References 

2nd-century BC Roman consuls
Roman Republican praetors
Cornelii Lentuli
Roman patricians